Roscoe Collegiate Independent School District is a public school district based in Roscoe, Texas (USA). The name was formerly Roscoe Independent School District, but it officially changed to its current name on October 22, 2012.

Located in Nolan County, small portions of the district extend into Fisher, Mitchell, and Scurry counties.

Roscoe Collegiate ISD has two campuses -

Roscoe Collegiate High School (Grades 7-12)
Roscoe Elementary School (Grades PK-6).

Paying tribute to the agricultural area which the district serves, the mascot is the Roscoe Plowboy.

Leadership  In Early College Programs 
In 2009 Roscoe Collegiate High School received the Texas Education Agency's Early College High School designation, making it the only rural school in Texas to be designated as such. Beginning with an associates degree program assisted with revenue from wind energy, RCISD developed a P-20 Program (Preschool to PhD) capability in cooperation with colleges and universities in the area, notably Western Texas College in Snyder and Texas State Technical College between Roscoe and Sweetwater, and  additional partnerships with Texas A&M AgriLife Extension, 4H, and the Texas Tech T-STEM Center.

In 2009, the school district was rated "recognized" by the Texas Education Agency.

References

External links
Roscoe ISD
Highland ISD

School districts in Nolan County, Texas
School districts in Fisher County, Texas
School districts in Mitchell County, Texas
School districts in Scurry County, Texas